Scleronotus scabrosus is a species of beetle in the family Cerambycidae. It was described by Thomson in 1861.

References

Acanthoderini
Beetles described in 1861